The Immigration Act 1988 was an act of the Parliament of the United Kingdom which updated the rules around immigration to the United Kingdom, the Isle of Man and the Channel Islands.

A principal element introduced by this legislation was with respect to the spouses of polygamous marriages. In particular, only one wife or widow would be entitled to come to the UK.

References 

United Kingdom Acts of Parliament 1988
Immigration law in the United Kingdom